Elving Andersson (2 April 1953) is a Swedish politician. He is a member of the Centre Party. Andersson was a member of the Parliament of Sweden between 1982 and 1998.

References

Members of the Riksdag from the Centre Party (Sweden)
1953 births
Living people
20th-century Swedish politicians